Koosharem is a town in Sevier County, Utah, United States. Koosharem is also known as "Grass Valley".  It generally comprises the area known as Burrville, Utah on the north, south through the valley and through the town of Koosharem and down to the south end with the town of Greenwich, Utah. The valley is made up of private lands nestled within the Fishlake National Forest. Koosharem is situated at the cross-roads for travelers going between Capitol Reef National Park and Bryce Canyon National Park and/or Zion National Park. Koosharem is also the closest town to the famous Fish Lake. The town also serves as an important point along the many trails of the Piute ATV Trail System.

Koosharem's only store, the historic Grass Valley Mercantile, shares this secondary naming reference.

The name of the town Koosharem originates from the Native Americans indigenous to the area, the Piute Indians and their term for the valley named for the deep red clover that grows in the lush meadows of the Koosharem Valley,. The population was 276 at the 2000 census.

Geography
According to the United States Census Bureau, the town has a total area of 0.6 square miles (1.5 km2), all land. A 2008 annexation increased the population to an official estimate of 400.

Koosharem has one church, a cemetery, baseball diamond, fire station, a dairy, a motel, two restaurants, and a store (post office located inside that store).

Koosharem is rural and isolated but relatively centrally located. The table shows driving miles from the center of Koosharem to the following:

Koosharem and the Grass Valley include habitat for threatened and endangered species. These species include the Greater Sage Grouse, the Utah Prairie Dog, Pygmy Rabbit, bald eagles, golden eagles, western toad, ferruginous hawk,

Economy
The economy of Koosharem is primarily agriculture based. Koosharem does have other economic contributors including the Sorenson's Ranch School for troubled youth, ATV rentals, and tourism from the national parks, hunting and guiding, national forest (Fishlake National Forest) visitors, Paiute ATV Trail riders, and sight seers.

Koosharem's reputation as world class wildlife destination got bolstered in 2008 when the world record "Spider Bull" Elk was taken on the mountains just west of Koosharem.

Demographics

As of the census of 2010, there were 327 people residing in Koosharem, an 18.48% increase from 2000. In the 2000 census, there were 276 people, 88 households, and 79 families residing in the town. The population density was 497.1 people per square mile (190.3/km2). There were 133 housing units at an average density of 239.5 per square mile (91.7/km2). The racial makeup of the town was 94.93% White, 1.45% Native American, 1.09% Asian, 0.36% Pacific Islander, 1.81% from other races, and 0.36% from two or more races. Hispanic or Latino of any race were 4.71% of the population.

There were 88 households, out of which 46.6% had children under the age of 18 living with them, 80.7% were married couples living together, 6.8% had a female householder with no husband present, and 9.1% were non-families. 9.1% of all households were made up of individuals, and 6.8% had someone living alone who was 65 years of age or older. The average household size was 3.14 and the average family size was 3.30.

In the town, the population was spread out, with 35.1% under the age of 18, 10.1% from 18 to 24, 22.1% from 25 to 44, 21.0% from 45 to 64, and 11.6% who were 65 years of age or older. The median age was 30 years. For every 100 females, there were 98.6 males. For every 100 females age 18 and over, there were 103.4 males.

The median income for a household in the town was $34,583, and the median income for a family was $40,625. Males had a median income of $32,500 versus $18,929 for females. The per capita income for the town was $13,481. About 5.3% of families and 8.8% of the population were below the poverty line, including 16.0% of those under the age of 18 and none of those 65 or over.

Education
Koosharem is located in the Sevier School District and has one elementary school.

See also

 List of cities and towns in Utah

References

External links

Towns in Utah
Towns in Sevier County, Utah
Populated places established in 1877
1877 establishments in Utah Territory